Liomesus is a genus of sea snails, marine gastropod mollusks in the family Buccinidae, the true whelks.

Species
Species within the genus Liomesus include:

 Liomesus ovum (Turton, 1825)
 Liomesus stimpsoni Dall, 1889

References

External links

Buccinidae